Pichetto may refer to:

 Gilberto Pichetto Fratin (born 1954), Italian politician
 Miguel Ángel Pichetto (born 1950), Argentine lawyer and politician